This page is an overview of the qualification criteria for the 2009 UCI Road World Championships.

Elite events

Elite men's road race

Qualification was based on performances on the UCI run tours during 2009. Results from January to the middle of August would count towards the qualification criteria on both the 2009 UCI ProTour and the UCI Continental Circuits across the world, with the rankings being determined upon the release of the numerous tour rankings on 15 August 2009.

Elite women's road race

Qualification will be based mainly on the 2009 UCI Nation Ranking as of 15 August 2009. The first five nations in this classification qualified 7 riders to start, the next ten nations qualified 6 riders to start and the next 5 nations qualified 5 riders to start. Other nations and non ranked nations had the possibility to send 3 riders to start. Moreover, the outgoing World Champion and continental champions are qualified to take part in the race on top of the nation numbers.

Elite men's time trial

All National Federations were allowed to register four riders for the race, with a maximum of two riders to start. In addition to this number, the outgoing World Champion and the current continental champions may take part.

Elite women's time trial

All National Federations were allowed to register four riders for the race, with a maximum of two riders to start. In addition to this number, the outgoing World Champion and the current continental champions were also able to take part.

Under-23 events

Men's under-23 road race

Men's under-23 time trial

All National Federations were allowed to register four riders for the race, with a maximum of two riders to start. In addition to this number, the outgoing World Champion and the current continental champions may take part

References

2009 UCI Road World Championships
Qualification for the UCI Road World Championships